The 1954 Detroit Lions season was their 25th in the league. The team failed to improve on their previous season's output of 10–2, winning only nine games. They qualified for the championship game for the third consecutive season.

Offseason

NFL Draft

The Lions drafted 32 players in the 1954 NFL Draft. Their first-round pick was Dick Chapman, an All-American defensive tackle out of Rice. Chapman never played a snap for the Lions, electing to return to Rice and finish his degree in physics. Their second-round pick, Michigan State center Jim Neal, also never played a snap after "marr[ying] a girl whose religion prohibited him to play football on Sundays."

Regular season

Schedule

 Saturday night (October 16, November 6), Thursday (November 25: Thanksgiving)

Standings

Postseason

Roster

References

External links
1954 Detroit Lions at Pro Football Reference
1954 Detroit Lions at jt-sw.com

Detroit Lions seasons
Detroit Lions
Detroit Lions